Dùn Eibhinn, also known as Dun Evan, Dun Eivan or Fort of Eyvind, is a hillfort located on the Inner Hebridean island of Colonsay, Scotland.

Believed to have been built as a royal residence in the early 11th century, it was a seat of Viking power in the Hebrides. The fort came into Clan Macfie possession in the early part of the 13th century. In 1623 after Malcolm Macfie of Colonsay, Chief of Clan Macfie was killed in a feud by Coll Mac Gillespick MacDonald, the fort was abandoned and became ruinous.

Citations

References
Kevin Byrne (1997), Colkitto! A Celebration of Clan Donald of Colonsay 1570-1647

External links

Archaeological sites in the Southern Inner Hebrides
Hill forts in Scotland
Colonsay
Former populated places in Scotland
Scheduled monuments in Scotland